Klaeden may refer to:

People
 Eckart von Klaeden, politician (CDU), born 1965 in Hannover, Germany  
 Dietrich von Klaeden, journalist and lawyer, born in 1966 in Hannover, Germany 
 Sandra von Klaeden, lawyer and politician (CDU), née Kuban 1969 in Hann. Gmünden  
 a line of Prussian nobility, also Kloeden or Klöden

Places
 Kläden, a village in Altmarkkreis Salzwedel, Germany 
 Kläden, Stendal, a village in district Stendal, Germany

Disambiguation pages with surname-holder lists